Parabambusa is a genus of flowering plants belonging to the family Poaceae.

Its native range is New Guinea.

Species
Species:
 Parabambusa kaini Widjaja

References

Bambusoideae
Bambusoideae genera